Chelophyes is a genus of hydrozoans belonging to the family Diphyidae.

Species:

Chelophyes appendiculata 
Chelophyes contorta

References

Diphyidae
Hydrozoan genera